The 1950 All-Pacific Coast football team consists of American football players chosen by various organizations for All-Pacific Coast teams for the 1950 college football season.

Selections

Backs
 Don Heinrich, Washington (AP-1; Coaches-1; UP-1 [quarterback])
 Hugh McElhenny, Washington (AP-1; Coaches-1; UP-1)
 Jim Monachino, California (AP-1; Coaches-1; UP-1)
 Johnny Olszewski, California (AP-1; UP-1 [fullback])
 Dick Sprague, Washington (AP-1 [defensive back]; Coaches-1 [defensive back])
 Carl Van Heuit, California (AP-1 [safety]; Coaches-1 [safety])
 Pete Schabarum, California (Coaches-1)
 Roland Kirby, Washington (Coaches-1 [defensive back])
 Earl Stelle, Oregon (Coaches-1 [defensive back])
 Johnny Williams, USC (Coaches-1 [defensive back])
 Ollie Matson, Univ. San Francisco (AP-1 [defensive back])

Ends
 Bill McColl, Stanford (AP-1 [offensive and defensive end]; Coaches-1; UP-1)
 Bob Wilkinson, UCLA (AP-1; Coaches-1 [tie]; UP-1)
 Bob Minahen, California (AP-1 [defensive end]; Coaches-1 [defensive end])
 Joe Cloidt, Washington (Coaches-1)
 Ed Bartlett, California (Coaches-1 [defensive end])
 Darrell Riggs, UCLA (Coaches-1 [defensive end])

Tackles
 Volney Peters, USC (AP-1 [defensive tackle]; Coaches-1 [offensive and defensive tackle]; UP-1)
 Russ Pomeroy, Stanford (AP-1 [linebacker]; Coaches-1 [linebacker]; UP-1)
 Bob Karpe, California (AP-1; Coaches-1)
 Breck Strochein, UCLA (AP-1; Coaches-1 [defensive tackle])
 Niemi, Oregon State (AP-1 [defensive tackle])

Guards
 Les Richter, California (AP-1 [defensive guard]; Coaches-1 [offensive and defensive guard]; UP-1 [linebacker guard])
 Ted Holzknecht, Washington (AP-1; Coaches-1 [defensive guard]; UP-1)
 Bruce MacLachlan, UCLA (Coaches-1)
 Paul McMurtry, USC (Coaches-1)
 Daniels, Oregon (AP-1)
 Dick Stanfel, Univ. San Francisco (AP-1 [defensive guard])

Centers
 Donn Moomaw, UCLA (AP-1 [linebacker]; Coaches-1 [linebacker]; UP-1)
 Mike Michaels, Washington (Coaches-1)
 LaVern Torgeson, Washington State (AP-1)

Key

AP = Associated Press, selected for the AP by writers, coaches and scouts and based on a two-platoon system

Coaches = selected by the conference coaches and announced by the PCC Commissioner's office

UP = United Press, "selected with the aid of West Coast sports writers"

Bold = Consensus first-team selection of the AP, UP and coaches

See also
1950 College Football All-America Team

References

All-Pacific Coast Football Team
All-Pacific Coast football teams
All-Pac-12 Conference football teams